Ajanbahu is a Sanskrit word to describe a person whose length of arms is such that his fingers touch his knee.

In Indian culture, persons with such physical characteristics are either gods, saints, kings or great warriors. The idols of Hindu gods like Rama, Lakshmana, Krishna when shown in standing position are depicted as ajanbahu feature. Even idols of Jain Tirthankars are shown as ajanbahu. The great saints like, Sai Baba of Shirdi, Ramkrishna Paramhansa, Swami Samartha and Gajanan Maharaj were said to have ajanbahu characteristic.

In Buddhism, it is sometimes called paṭūrubāhatā or sthitānavanatājānupralambabāhuḥ. It is among the thirty-two marks of a great man and as such, is characteristic of all Buddhas. 

Ajanbahu Jatbasha, was so called because of the length of his arms, his fingers reaching to his knees (ajanbahu)

References

See also
Samudrika Shastra
Ape_index
Physiognomy
Buddhist iconography